"Everyday People" is a 1968 song composed by Sly Stone and first recorded by his band, Sly and the Family Stone. It was the first single by the band to go to number one on the Soul singles chart and the U.S. Billboard Hot 100 chart.  It held that position on the Hot 100 for four weeks, from February 9 to March 8, 1969, and is remembered as one of the most popular songs of the 1960s. Billboard ranked it as the No. 5 song of 1969.

Overview

The song is one of Sly Stone's pleas for peace and equality between differing races and social groups, a major theme and focus for the band. The Family Stone featured Caucasians Greg Errico and Jerry Martini in its lineup, as well as females Rose Stone and Cynthia Robinson; making it an early major integrated band in rock history. Sly and the Family Stone's message was about peace and equality through music, and this song reflects the same.

Unlike the band's more typically funky and psychedelic records, "Everyday People" is a mid-tempo number with a more mainstream pop feel. Sly, singing the main verses for the song, explains that he is "no better / and neither are you / we are the same / whatever we do."

Sly's sister Rose Stone sings bridging sections (using the cadence of the "na-na na-na boo-boo" children's taunt) that mock the futility of people hating each other for being tall, short, rich, poor, fat, skinny, white, black, or anything else. The bridges of the song contain the line "different strokes for different folks", which became a popular catchphrase in 1969 (and inspired the name of the later television series, Diff'rent Strokes). Rose's singing ends each part of the bridge with the words:  "And so on, and so on, and scooby dooby doo".

During the chorus, all of the singing members of the band (Sly, Rosie, Larry Graham, and Sly's brother Freddie Stone) proclaim that "I am everyday people," meaning that each of them (and each listener as well) should consider himself or herself as parts of one whole, not of smaller, specialized factions.

Bassist Larry Graham contends that the track featured the first instance of the "slap bass technique", which would become a staple of funk and other genres.  The technique involves striking a string with the thumb of the right hand (or left hand, for a left-handed player) so that the string collides with the frets, producing a metallic "clunk" at the beginning of the note. Later slap bass songs – for example, Graham's performance on "Thank You (Falettinme Be Mice Elf Again)" – expanded on the technique, incorporating a complementary "pull" or "pop" component.

"Everyday People" was included on the band's classic album Stand! (1969), which sold over three million copies. It is one of the most covered songs in the band's repertoire, with versions by the Winstons, Aretha Franklin, the Staple Singers, William Bell, Joan Jett and the Blackhearts, the Supremes and the Four Tops, Peggy Lee, Belle & Sebastian, Pearl Jam, and Nicole C. Mullen, Ta Mara and the Seen and many others. Hip-hop group Arrested Development used the song as the basis of their 1992 hit, "People Everyday", which reached No. 2 on the UK Singles Chart and No. 8 on the Hot 100. Dolly Parton's previously unreleased 1980 cover of the song was included as a bonus track on the 2009 reissue of her 9 to 5 and Odd Jobs album. Rolling Stone ranked "Everyday People" as No. 145 on their list of the 500 Greatest Songs of All Time. "Everyday People" was prominently featured in a series of Toyota commercials in the late 1990s as part of their "Everyday" slogan campaign. In 2021, the song appeared in another TV commercial, this time for Aspen Dental.

The third verse of Sly and the Family Stone's 1969 "Thank You (Falettinme Be Mice Elf Agin)", a No. 1 hit by February 1970, references the titles of "Everyday People" and several of the band's other successful songs.

Notable versions
Soul singer Billy Paul covered the song on his 1970 album Ebony Woman.

Joan Jett's version appears on her 1983 release Album.

"Everyday People" by Ta Mara and the Seen was a minor hit in the Philippines in 1988.

Aretha Franklin performed a version of the song for her 1991 album What You See Is What You Sweat.

A unique instrumental rendition of "Everyday People" is featured on the 1998 album Combustication by jazz fusion trio Medeski Martin & Wood.

Hip hop group Arrested Development released an adapted version of "Everyday People" on their 1992 album 3 Years, 5 Months & 2 Days in the Life Of... titled as "People Everyday".

The 2005 Sly and the Family Stone tribute album Different Strokes by Different Folks features a cover by Maroon 5, accompanied by samples from the original recording.

A version by Jeff Buckley is included in the posthumously released album You and I.

Jon Batiste and Stay Human performed the song along other guest musicians on the first episode of The Late Show with Stephen Colbert.

The Staple Singers released a version on their 1970 album We'll Get Over.

Personnel
 Sly Stone: vocals
 Rose Stone: vocals, piano
 Freddie Stone: vocals, guitar
 Larry Graham: vocals, bass guitar
 Greg Errico: drums, background vocals
 Jerry Martini: saxophone, background vocals
 Cynthia Robinson: trumpet, vocal ad-libs
 Engineered by Don Puluse
 Written and produced by Sly Stone

Charts
The song was ranked No. 5 on Billboard magazine's Top Hot 100 songs of 1969.

Weekly charts

All-time charts

Certifications

Notes

References

External links
 

1968 singles
1969 singles
1983 singles
Sly and the Family Stone songs
Joan Jett songs
Billboard Hot 100 number-one singles
Cashbox number-one singles
Song recordings produced by Sly Stone
Songs written by Sly Stone
Songs against racism and xenophobia
Epic Records singles
1968 songs